Ramón Antonio Esteban Gómez Valdés y Castillo (2 September 1923 – 9 August 1988) was a Mexican actor and comedian. He is best remembered for his portrayal of Don Ramón. He is also recognized as one of Mexico's best comedians.

Born in Mexico City, he was raised in a humble and large family that moved to Ciudad Juárez when he was aged two. Valdés made his acting debut at cinema in the movie Tender Pumpkins (1949), appearing along with his brother, Germán Valdés, already an actor better known as "Tin-Tan", and who introduced Ramón into the acting world. Under extra or supporting roles, he continued making appearances in films during the Golden Age of Mexican cinema. Ramón and Germán had two other brothers, also actors, Manuel Valdés, better known as "Manuel "El Loco" Valdés", and Antonio Valdés, better known as "El Ratón Valdés".

In 1968, Valdés met Roberto Gómez Bolaños, better known as "Chespirito", with whom he began working on programs such as Los supergenios de la mesa cuadrada, Chespirito and El Chapulín Colorado. It was on Bolaños's sitcom El Chavo del Ocho that he gained international fame for his portrayal of Don Ramón. He left El Chavo del Ocho in 1979 but returned in 1981 for his final year on the project.

In 1982, Valdés starred with Carlos Villagrán on the Venezuelan sitcom Federrico and on Ah que Kiko in 1987.

Life and career

1923–1968: Childhood, early career and multiple films 

Ramón Antonio Esteban Gómez Valdés y Castillo was born on 2 September, 1923, in Mexico City, a son of Rafael Gómez-Valdés Angellini and Guadalupe Castillo. He lived a quiet childhood, without being surrounded by many luxuries. He had several brothers, Germán Valdés "Tin Tan", Manuel "El Loco" Valdés, Antonio Valdés "El Ratón Valdés", Guadalupe, Angela, Cristóbal, Antonio and Armando. He was nicknamed "El Moncho". At the age of two, his family moved to Ciudad Juárez.

In his youth, Valdés earned his living in multiple activities and trades, and due to this instability, he sometimes faced economic problems. At the same time he began his artistic career thanks to the support of his brother Germán ("Tin Tan"), who took him to act with him in different projects, so he participated in more than 50 films of the Golden Age of Mexican cinema. His film debut took place on Tender Pumpkins (1949). He continued appearing on multiple movies as an extra or with supporting roles till he met Roberto Gomez Bolaños (Chespirito) in 1968.

1968–1980: Meeting with Chespirito and career success 

In 1968, he met Roberto Gomez Bolaños (Chespirito) on the program Sábados de la fortuna, Bolaños saw the talent of Váldes and he made him part of the cast of comedians for his new television project called Los supergenios de la mesa cuadrada, where he performed along with María Antonieta de las Nieves and Rubén Aguirre. Then the program changed its name to Chespirito. It was so successful that it was on television for many years. Then came the television bomb El Chavo del Ocho in 1973, where he played Don Ramón, achieving more success and recognition than he had experienced before. It is said that his character was similar to Váldes in real life. Coworker Rubén Aguirre stated:

He also participated in El Chapulín Colorado airing in 1973 in which he portrayed multiple characters.

1980–1988: Return with Chespirito and final projects 
After quitting the part of Don Ramon in El Chavo del Ocho, Valdés continued making films until 1986.

He returned to television in 1981, performing in "Chespirito" as his former characters. He also returned to "El Chavo del Ocho", this being kept as a secret until the moment of recording. According to the history behind his return on one of the episodes in the series, Váldes entered the set to surprise La Chilindrina (María Antonieta de las Nieves) and such was the surprise of the actress, that the tears shed during that scene were real. Valdés only stayed one more year in the production as at the end of that year he left the program forever.

In 1982, Valdés returned to television with Carlos Villagrán on the Venezuelan show Federrico and on Ah que Kiko in 1987 with these two being his final projects.

Other media 
In 1984, Váldez starred in a musical program entitled "Aprendiz de Pirata" (Spanish for "Pirate Apprentice") with Luis Miguel in which he performed his song "Tú No Tienes Corazón" of his 1984 album Palabra de honor.

Personal life 
He was of Italian descent. Valdés owned a circus. According to Valdés, he had a falling out with Chespirito after he refused to lend Valdés 20,000 pesos he needed to buy a house.

Valdés had three wives and, as a result of his relationships, had 10 children. One of his wives was the singer Araceli Julián.

Valdés kept a strong friendship with an actress on El Chavo del Ocho, Angelines Fernández, better known on the show as Doña Clotilde "La Bruja del 71". At Valdés's funeral, Fernández stayed standing in front of his coffin and crying inconsolably because of his death. He was also good friends with María Antonieta de las Nieves.

He was the uncle of Mexican pop singer Cristian Castro; his brother Manuel "El Loco" Váldes is Castro's father.

Death 

Valdés was a tobacco smoker and people close to him stated that it was not unusual to see him with a cigarette in the recording sets.

On 9 August 1988, Valdés died of stomach cancer at age 64. The cancer had spread to his spinal cord. Valdés was entombed at Mausoleos del Ángel in Mexico City, the same cemetery where Angelines Fernández rests.

Legacy 
Valdés is remembered as one of the most beloved actors from El Chavo del Ocho for portraying Don Ramón.

Posthumous documentary 
On 17 May 2019, a trailer on Valdés’ official YouTube account was released for Con permisito dijo Monchito (Spanish for, Excuse me, said Little Moncho), a documentary featuring Valdés's life with unpublished material, interviews with fans and fellow co-workers and little known things about him.

Filmography

Film

Television

References

External links 

 Ramón Valdés on YouTube
 

1923 births
1988 deaths
20th-century Mexican male actors
Chespirito actors
Deaths from stomach cancer
Deaths from cancer in Mexico
Golden Age of Mexican cinema
Mexican male film actors
Mexican male television actors
Mexican male comedians
Male actors from Mexico City
Mexican people of Italian descent
Mexican people of Spanish descent
20th-century comedians